Knipowitschia mrakovcici is a species of freshwater goby Endemic to the Krka River catchment in Croatia where it is only found in lakes.  Males of this species can reach a length of  SL while females only reach  SL. The specific name honours the Croatian biologist Milorad Mrakovčić of the University of Zagreb, who provided the author, Peter J. Miller, with the original type material.

References

mrakovcici
Freshwater fish of Europe
Endemic fauna of Croatia
Fish described in 2009